Caraffa del Bianco is a comune (municipality) in the Province of Reggio Calabria in the Italian region Calabria, located about  southwest of Catanzaro and about  east of Reggio Calabria.

Caraffa del Bianco borders the following municipalities: Bianco, Casignana, Ferruzzano, Sant'Agata del Bianco.

The revolutionary Rocco Verduci (1824-1847) was born at Caraffa del Bianco.

Demographic evolution

References

Cities and towns in Calabria